Natacha Peyre Requena (born 26 March 1985), known as Elena Belle, is a Swedish blogger, singer and model. She is best known for participating in Paradise Hotel and being a main cast member of Svenska Hollywoodfruar.

Early life
Born in Ibiza, Spain, she is half-Spanish on her mother's side and fluent in Spanish, Swedish, and English. She is also known as Elena Belle.

Career 
In 2005, she participated in the Swedish reality show Paradise Hotel which was broadcast on TV4.

In 2016, she played in the Carl's Jr. commercial for the Three-Way Burger, along with models Emily Sears and Genevieve Morton.

Since 2016, she as well is a main cast member of Svenska Hollywoodfruar which is broadcast on TV3.

She is also the owner of the swimsuit brand Saltyhair. She as a model became the face of the Panos Emporio brand SS20.

Personal life
Belle was married to music producer Michael Theanne. He died in February 2020.

Discography 
TNT (2006)
In Control (2008)

Filmography 
Aylar - Ett År I Rampelyset (2005)

References

External links 

1985 births
Living people
People from Ibiza
Swedish female models
Swedish bloggers
Swedish women bloggers
Swedish socialites
Spanish female models
Spanish bloggers
Spanish socialites
Spanish women bloggers
Spanish emigrants to Sweden
Spanish people of Swedish descent